Issabel is open-source Unified Communications PBX software, providing user-friendly web-based configuration, management, and reporting for telephony. Modules providing predictive dialing can be added. It is a fork of the open-source versions of Elastix, developed by the user/developer community when 3CX acquired Elastix, closed the community, halted distribution and development of the open-source versions, and released a proprietary version.

Issabel is based upon open-source versions of Elastix, Asterisk, FreePBX, HylaFAX, Openfire and Postfix and provides PBX, fax, instant messaging and e-mail server functionality.

Issabel is open-source software licensed under the GNU General Public License.

References

External links 
 
 Issabel Foundation GitHub organization

Free VoIP software
Telephone exchanges
Free business software
Communication software
Asterisk (PBX)
FreePBX